Scopula riedeli is a moth of the family Geometridae which is endemic to Yemen.

References

Moths described in 2006
Endemic fauna of Yemen
Moths of Asia
riedeli